Komaru (小丸) may refer to:
 Komaru Castle, Japanese castle
 Komaru Naegi, Danganronpa character
 Mount Komaru, mountain in Japan